Michael Dürsch (born 28 March 1957 in Herrsching, Bayern) is a retired German rower who won a gold medal at the 1984 Summer Olympics in Los Angeles.

References

Rowers at the 1984 Summer Olympics
Olympic rowers of West Germany
Olympic gold medalists for West Germany
1957 births
Living people
Olympic medalists in rowing
West German male rowers
Medalists at the 1984 Summer Olympics
World Rowing Championships medalists for West Germany
People from Starnberg (district)
Sportspeople from Upper Bavaria